
"Welcome to My World" is a popular music standard written by Ray Winkler and John Hathcock, and recorded by many artists, most notably Jim Reeves.  The melody was likely written by Eddie McDuff rather than Winkler. A traditional love song, the bridge includes lyrics taken from Matthew 7:7–8 ("Knock and the door will open; seek and you will find; ask and you'll be given ... ," from the Sermon on the Mount).

Jim Reeves version
The most famous version was performed by country music singer Jim Reeves, who styled the song in his favoured style of Nashville Sound. Reeves' version was included on his 1962 album A Touch of Velvet and was released as a single in the United States in early 1964, reaching No. 2 on the Billboard Hot Country Singles chart in the spring of that year. It was also occasionally aired on pop radio stations, reaching the No. 2 spot on Billboard's Bubbling Under Hot 100 chart. The song became one of Reeves' last major hits in the U.S. during his lifetime, as he was killed in a plane crash on July 31, 1964.

Reeves' version of "Welcome to My World" had been a hit single in the United Kingdom prior to its release as a single in the U.S., peaking at No. 6 in July 1963, and reaching No. 60 on the list of the top 100 best-selling singles of 1963 in the UK.

Chart performance

References

1963 singles
Jim Reeves songs
1962 songs
RCA Records singles